Debbie Jacobs (born November 10, 1955, in Baltimore, Maryland) is an American singer who had several disco hits.

Biography
Her biggest chart hit was "High on Your Love", which climbed to #70 on the Billboard Hot 100 in 1980.  The song, along with "Hot Hot (Give It All You Got)" went to #1 on the Hot Dance Music/Club Play chart. Other 1970s hits included, "Don't You Want My Love" and "Undercover Lover", which are her best-known hit singles. She enjoyed a second #1 dance hit in 2000 in a new version of her 1970s club hit song "Don't You Want My Love" (as Debbie Jacobs-Rock), produced by Rosabel.

Undercover Lover album was released in 1979 (MCA Records).

Other famous disco/club-era tracks performed by Debbie Jacobs include "Doctor Music" and "Maybe This Time", the latter of which is now a rare record and has been known to fetch high asking prices.

See also
List of number-one dance hits (United States)
List of artists who reached number one on the US Dance chart

References

External links
  USA-DANCE

Jacobs-Rock, Debbie
Jacobs-Rock
Jacobs-Rock, Debbie
Jacobs-Rock, Debbie
Living people
1955 births
Musicians from Baltimore
21st-century American women